Paul Sarah (born 19 December 1953) is a former Australian rules footballer who played with the Geelong Football Club and Richmond Football Club in the VFL. Beat St Kilda with a goal after the siren in 1981.

External links

Paul Sarah's profile at Tigerland Archive

1953 births
Living people
Australian rules footballers from Victoria (Australia)
Geelong Football Club players
Richmond Football Club players
East Geelong Football Club players